Tabanus sudeticus, also known as the dark giant horsefly, is a species of biting horse-fly. It is the heaviest fly in Europe.

Description 
The dark giant horsefly's length is around 20-25 millimeters. They have uniform dark brown eyes.

Dark giant horseflies are a common species to be found buzzing around cows and horses. They usually only suck blood from those horses and cows, avoiding humans. They fly with a very loud buzzing.

Distribution 

Tabanus sudeticus is found in many countries of Western Europe. It has a marked northern and western distribution; being found as far north as southern Norway and the Western Isles of Scotland, and with an occasional record from Belarus.

References

Tabanidae
Diptera of Europe
Taxa named by Philipp Christoph Zeller
Insects described in 1842